Highway 288 (AR 288, Ark. 288 and Hwy. 288) is a designation for two east–west state highways in northwest Arkansas. One segment of  runs from Highway 41 near Peter Pender east to Highway 309. A second segment of  runs east connecting Highway 197 to Highway 109.

Route description

Peter Pender to Roseville
Highway 288 begins at Highway 41 near the unincorporated community Peter Pender. The route runs east, intersecting Highway 23 before entering Logan County and terminating at Highway 309 at Roseville. The road is two–lane undivided for its entire length.

Highway 197 to Prairie View
The highway begins just east of Wilkins at Highway 197. Highway 288 heads due east to Prairie View, where it terminates at Highway 109. The road is two–lane undivided for its entire length.

Major intersections

See also

 List of state highways in Arkansas

References

External links

288
Transportation in Franklin County, Arkansas
Transportation in Logan County, Arkansas